Songs for the Philologists is a collection of poems by E. V. Gordon and J. R. R. Tolkien as well as traditional songs. It is the rarest and most difficult to find Tolkien-related book. Originally a collection of typescripts compiled by Gordon in 1921–1926 for the students of the University of Leeds, it was given by A. H. Smith of University College London, a former student at Leeds, to a group of students to be printed privately in 1935 or 1936, and printed in 1936 with the impressum "Printed by G. Tillotson, A. H. Smith, B. Pattison and other members of the English Department, University College, London."

Since Smith had not asked permission of either Gordon or Tolkien, the printed booklets were not distributed. Most copies were destroyed in a fire, and only a few, perhaps around 14, survived. The book is accordingly "extremely rare", according to the University of Leeds, which has a copy.

Tolkien's songs

Of the 30 songs in the collection, 13 were contributed by Tolkien:

1 "From One to Five", to the tune of "Three Wise Men of Gotham".

2 "Syx Mynet" (Old English),  to the tune of "I Love Sixpence".

3 "Ruddoc Hana" (Old English),  to the tune of "Who Killed Cock Robin".

4 "Ides Ælfscýne" (Old English), to the tune of "Daddy Neptune".
--- Reprinted, together with a Modern English translation ('Elf-fair Lady') in The Road to Middle-earth

5 "Bagmē Blōma" (Gothic), to the tune of "Lazy Sheep" (by Mantle Childe, after an old French air). The poem displays Tolkien's love of trees, and of language.
--- Reprinted, together with a Modern English translation ('Flower of the Trees') in The Road to Middle-earth

6 "Éadig Béo þu!" (Old English), to the tune of "Twinkle, Twinkle, Little Star".
--- Reprinted, together with a Modern English translation ("Good Luck to You") in The Road to Middle-earth

7 "Ofer Wídne Gársecg" (Old English), to the tune of "The Mermaid".
--- Reprinted, together with a Modern English translation ("Across the Broad Ocean") in The Road to Middle-earth

8 "La Húru", to the tune of "O'Reilly".

9 "I Sat upon a Bench", to the tune of "The Carrion Crow".

10 "Natura Apis: Morali Ricardi Eremite", also to the tune of "O'Reilly".

11 "The Root of the Boot", to the tune of "The Fox Went Out".
--- Reprinted in Anderson's The Annotated Hobbit, and in a revised form in The Return of the Shadow. Reprinted in The Tolkien Papers: Mankato Studies in English. Revised and printed in The Lord of the Rings and The Adventures of Tom Bombadil as 'The Stone Troll'. The manuscript is archived at the University of Leeds. The scholar of folklore Dimitra Fimi writes that the song's metre and rhyming scheme are those of the 15th century folk song "The fox went out on a winter's night"; Tolkien used the same scheme for the two "lays" (narrative poems) published in his Beowulf: A Translation and Commentary.

12 "Frenchmen Froth", to the tune of "The Vicar of Bray".

13 "Lit' and Lang'", to the tune of "Polly Put the Kettle On". In the Department of English at the University of Oxford where Tolkien worked, teaching was divided into two streams. "Lit'" meant "English Literature", i.e. the study of works from Shakespeare to modern times, whereas "Lang'" meant "English Language", meaning the philological study of Old English texts such as Beowulf, and Middle English, such as Sir Gawain and the Green Knight. Tolkien and Gordon were philologists and firmly in the "Lang'" camp, but they could see that it was dying out.

The remaining songs 

The remaining 17 songs were:

1 Grace.  To be sung to the tune of "The King of France".

2 Fara Með Víkingum. [Icelandic: To go with the Vikings] By Egill Skallagrímsson. Tolkien and Gordon had started a "Viking Club" at the University of Leeds, where they and their students sang songs and drank beer. The Leeds philologist Alaric Hall stated in 2015 that the tradition still continued in the department.

3 Já, láttu gamminn. [Icelandic] By Hannes Hafstein

4 Bring Us In Good Ale.

5 Björt Mey Og Hrein. [Icelandic] Translation of a Polish folk song by Stefán Ólafsson

6 Rokkvísa. [Icelandic: Song about rocks]

7 Ólafur Liljurós. [Icelandic: a man's name]. The folk song tells of a man who meets an Elvish maiden.

8 Gaudeamus. [Latin: Let us rejoice]

9 Icelandic Song [Það liggur svo makalaust].  [Icelandic: It's so incomparable] To be sung to the tune of "O' Reilly". By Bjarni Þorsteinsson

10 Su Klukka Heljar. [Icelandic: That Bell of Hell] To be sung to the tune of "The Bells of Hell".  By E. V. Gordon

11 Gubben Noach. [Swedish: Old Man Noah] By Carl Michael Bellman, accompanied by Icelandic translation by Eiríkur Björnsson

12 Bí, bí Og Blaka. [Icelandic lullaby] By Sveinbjörn Egilsson

13 Guþ let vaxa. [Icelandic] By Hannes Hafstein. To be sung to the tune of "Laus Deo" by Josef Haydn.

14 Salve! [Latin: Greetings!]

15 Hwan ic béo déad.  [Old English, Scots, and Gothic: When I'm Dead]

16 Vísur Íslendinga. [Icelandic: Icelandic Song] By Jónas Hallgrímsson

17 Gömul Kynni. [Icelandic] By Árni Pálsson, imitating Robert Burns

References

External links
 TolkienBooks.net - Songs for the Philologists
 Songs for the Philologists by J. R. R. Tolkien and E. V. Gordon - article and review

Books by J. R. R. Tolkien
British poetry collections
Poetry by J. R. R. Tolkien
1936 books
1936 poetry books